Bachana "Bacho" Akhalaia (born October 24, 1980, in Zugdidi) is a Georgian politician who was Minister of Internal Affairs of Georgia from July 4, 2012, to September 20, 2012. He had previously served as Head of Penitentiary Department of Ministry of Justice of Georgia (2005–2008) and Minister of Defense (August 27, 2009 – July 4, 2012).

On September 20, 2012, amid protests against torture and rapes in Georgian prisons, the Ministry of Internal Affairs announced Akhalaia had resigned from office.

Early career
Akhalaia graduated from the Tbilisi State University with a degree in law in 2003. From 2003 to 2004, he worked for the NGO Liberty Institute, known for his role in protests that led to the Rose Revolution in Georgia in November 2003. From 2004 to 2005, Akhalaia served as deputy Public Defender (Ombudsman) under his fellow Liberty Institute activist Sozar Subari. In 2005, Akhalaia was moved to the post of Head of Penitentiary Department of Ministry of Justice of Georgia. In this capacity he led a struggle against the established system of "thieves in law" which ruled prisons in the post-Soviet country, but he was a frequent target of criticism by the opposition, some human rights groups and Public Defender Subari. In particular, he was accused of heavy-handed crackdown on Georgia's largest prison riot in 2006, in which 7 inmates died.

Akhalaia has been seen as a close ally of Saakashvili and the influential Interior Minister Vano Merabishvili. His brother, Data Akhalaia, headed Department for Constitutional Security at the Interior Ministry and his father, Roland Akhalaia, was a chief prosecutor of Samegrelo-Zemo Svaneti region in western Georgia and the current member of the Parliament of Georgia.

Minister of Defense

In December 2008, in the aftermath of the August 2008 war with Russia, Akhalaia was appointed deputy Minister of Defense. The Georgian media ran stories about Akhalaia's alleged tensions with then-Minister Vasil Sikharulidze and Chief of Joint Staff Vladimer Chachibaia. On August 27, 2009, Akhalaia replaced Sikharulidze as Minister of Defense. President of Georgia Mikheil Saakashvili said "much stricter hand" was needed in the military and praised Akhalaia's past achievements. The Georgian opposition subjected the decision to harsh criticism.

WikiLeaks
According to the WikiLeaks cables, the United States and NATO diplomats also expressed concerns over Akhalaia's appointment as Minister of Defense "noting his poor human rights record" during his service as the chief of penitentiary service. However, in the October 10, 2009 confidential cable sent to Alexander Vershbow, the U.S. Assistant Secretary of Defense, ahead of his visit to Georgia, the U.S. embassy in Tbilisi described Akhalaia as "the most active Defense Minister in terms of seeking advice" from the U.S. defense advisers and "then following through with it." He was further noted for being, unlike his predecessor, "unafraid to make decisions" and "genuinely interested in making reforms designed to make the GAF [the Georgian Armed Forces] better."

Minister of Internal Affairs
On July 4, 2012, Akhalaia was appointed Minister of Internal Affairs, succeeding on this position Ivane Merabishvili, who became Prime Minister in an important cabinet reshuffle months before the scheduled parliamentary election.

Arrest and conviction

After the change of power in Georgia in 2012, the new government opened investigation against Akhalaia. In October 2013, He was found guilty in a trial over inhuman treatment of inmates in case related to 2006 Ortachala prison riot. However, then president Mikheil Saakashvili pardoned him in November 2013.

On 22 October 2014, the Tbilisi City Court sentenced Akhalaia to 7.5 years in prison on charges of torture and abuse of official powers. He was also deprived of the right to hold office for the term of 2 years and 3 months. According to the prosecutor, on January 12, 2006, the officers of Constitutional Security Department shot three young people with an unprecedented brutality near the Navtlughi bus terminal. In order to disguise it as the special operation, these people were unfairly declared as assaulters on prison. Bachana Akhalaia, who was a high-ranking government official at that time, ordered and directly participated in severely torturing six inmates in order to get from them a favourable testimony that murdered people were planning an armed attack on prison for the purpose of a mass escape of prisoners. Akhalaia was also found guilty in providing privileged prison conditions for the persons convicted on Sandro Girgvliani murder case.

On 23 April 2018, the court sentenced Akhalaia to 9 years in prison for torture, causing death of colonel Sergo Tetradze in 2011.

Akhalaia left prison in March 2022. He said that he did not plan to return to politics.

References

External links

    
    
    
    
    |-
    
    
     
    

1980 births
Living people
People from Zugdidi
Mingrelians
Defense ministers of Georgia
Interior ministers of Georgia
Lawyers from Georgia (country)
Tbilisi State University alumni
Public defenders